Durbuy is a city and municipality of Wallonia located in the province of Luxembourg, Belgium. 

The total area is 156.61 km², consisting of the following districts: Barvaux, Bende, Bomal, Borlon, Durbuy, Grandhan, Heyd, Izier, Septon, Tohogne, Villers-Sainte-Gertrude, and Wéris. 

On 1 January 2018 the municipality had 11,374 inhabitants with the most populous town of the municipality being Barvaux. Durbuy, for commercial reasons, often calls itself the world's smallest city, although Belgium's official smallest town, since 2006, is Mesen.

History 
In medieval times, Durbuy was an important centre of commerce and industry. In 1331, the town was elevated to the rank of city by John I, Count of Luxemburg, and King of Bohemia.

In 1628 Anthonie II Schetz obtains the Seigneurie of Durbuy, by permission of Felipe IV of Spain. One of the people connected to the city was the son of Lancelot II: Charles Hubert Augustin Schetz, (1662-1726), Count of Durbuy. In 1756 the descendants of the House of Schetz obtain the Castle. Since then the House of Ursel resides in the Castle. The current castle was built in 1880.

The Ourthe river flows through the municipality.

Tourism and recreation are its main activities nowadays. Durbuy is often represented, by itself and by tourism promoters, as 'the smallest city of the world'.

Gallery

See also
 List of protected heritage sites in Durbuy

References

External links

Durbuy municipality, official site
Awarded "EDEN - European Destinations of Excellence" non traditional tourist destination 2007

 
Cities in Wallonia
Sub-municipalities of Durbuy
Municipalities of Luxembourg (Belgium)